The Female Student Study Center – Al Malaz Branch was one of the three women-only satellite campuses of Imam Mohammad Ibn Saud Islamic University in al-Malazz, Riyadh, Saudi Arabia, active from 1984 to 2012. 

Established in 1984, the campus offered courses at undergraduate, postgraduate and doctorate levels in fields such as computer science, Islamic law, social science, human resource management and natural science. The students and faculty were relocated to the newly built King Abdullah City for Female Students in 2012 and thus, disbanding the campus.

History 
The Female Student Study Center in al-Malaz, Riyadh was established in 1984 alongside al-Batha and al-Nafal branches during the reign of King Fahd as one of three women-exclusive satellite campuses of Imam Mohammad Ibn Saud Islamic University to promote female education in Saudi Arabia.  the campus offered courses at undergraduate, postgraduate and doctorate levels in fields such as computer science, Islamic law, social science and natural science.

2012 relocation to King Abdullah City for Female Students 
In June 2001, Al Jazirah reported that residents living at Dhahran Street complained of overcrowding and excess emission of exhaust gas by vehicles due to the location of campus in the residential area. The column urged the authorities to take concrete steps to resolve the issue.

In January 2006, King Abdullah laid down the foundation for the construction of the 2 billion riyal King Abdullah City for Female Students in the western-part of the campus of Imam Mohammad Ibn Saud Islamic University. The relocation of the students from the satellite campuses to the new building gradually began in 2011 and was expected to be completed by early 2012 but was delayed till mid of 2012 due to lack of safety tests in the new buildings.

References 

Imam Muhammad ibn Saud Islamic University
1984 establishments in Saudi Arabia
Buildings and structures in Riyadh
Women's universities and colleges in Saudi Arabia
Educational institutions disestablished in 2012
Educational institutions established in 1984
2012 disestablishments in Saudi Arabia